The 2004 Las Vegas Gladiators season was the 8th season for the franchise.  This was the first season in which the Gladiators were members of the AFL's Western Division. They finished at 8–8, 4th in the Western Division.  The Gladiators did not qualify for the playoffs.

Season schedule

Coaching
Frank Haege entered his third and final season as the head coach of the Gladiators.

Stats

Offense

Quarterback

Running backs

Wide receivers

Touchdowns

Defense

Special teams

Kick return

Kicking

Las Vegas Gladiators
Las Vegas Gladiators seasons
2004 in sports in Nevada